Eurytides anaxilaus is a species of butterfly in the family Papilionidae. It is found in Panama, northern Venezuela and eastern and northern Colombia.

References

Further reading
Edwin Möhn, 2002 Schmetterlinge der Erde, Butterflies of the world Part XIIII (14), Papilionidae VIII: Baronia, Euryades, Protographium, Neographium, Eurytides. Edited by Erich Bauer and Thomas Frankenbach Keltern : Goecke & Evers ; Canterbury : Hillside Books.  All species and subspecies are included, also most of the forms. Several females are shown the first time in colour.

Eurytides
Butterflies described in 1865
Papilionidae of South America
Taxa named by Baron Cajetan von Felder
Taxa named by Rudolf Felder